The Marcus Foundation refers to three different foundations: The Marcus Niziak Childhood Brain Tumor Fund, The Grace R. and Alan D. Marcus Foundation and The Marcus Foundation

References

 The Marcus Foundation

Cancer organizations based in the United States
Health charities in the United States
Brain tumor
Medical and health organizations based in Colorado